is an art museum on Kōya-san, Wakayama Prefecture, Japan, preserving and displaying Buddhist art owned by temples on Kōya-san. The collection is centered around articles from the Heian and Kamakura periods and includes paintings, calligraphy, sutras, sculpture and Buddhist ritual objects. Among these are a set of the complete Buddhist canon (issaikyō), writings of Kūkai and  Minamoto no Yoritomo, founder of the Kamakura Shogunate, mandalas and portraits of priests. The most valuable objects have been designated as National Treasure or Important Cultural Property.

History
Kōbō-Daishi, founder of Shingon Buddhism was a proponent of religious art as a way to enlightenment. Consequently, Shingon temples such as on Koyasan are among Japan's greatest repositories of Buddhist art. Initially, Koyasan's religious treasures were spread among the various subtemples with the highest concentration at Kongōbu-ji. Valuable objects were either locked away or — if used liturgically — placed at a distance from the viewer and often poorly lit. Repeatedly unrolling  handscrolls or paintings on scrolls on request of visitors caused further damage. Following the Meiji Restoration, at the end of the 19th century, the government introduced a policy of separation of Shinto and Buddhism (Shinbutsu bunri) and many Buddhist temples became destitute. Some of Koyasan's artworks ended up in collections of museums in Tokyo, Kyoto or Nara or were sold to private persons, both domestically and to foreigners.

The Koyasan Reihōkan was established with the help of volunteers by Kongōbu-ji, the head temple at Koyasan, with the aim to preserve and exhibit the precious religious and cultural   heritage of Koyasan. Construction of the building in a wooded area southwest of Daishi Kyōkai, the administrative center of Shingon Buddhism, was completed on 30 September 1920.  This first museum consisted of two connected halls and was designed to vaguely resemble the Phoenix Hall at Byōdō-in, Uji. The opening of the museum was celebrated on 15 May 1921 and the head priest of Kongōbu-ji, Hōryū Doki (土宜法龍) assumed the position of first director. Subsequently, the temple's head priests continued to work as museum director.

In 1984, on the 1150th anniversary of Kōbō-Daishi entering the state of eternal meditation (nyūjō (入定)), a new large standalone and fireproof building was constructed to the east of the old structure, effectively doubling the display space. It also provided the museum with modern features such as proper lighting, full temperature and humidity control; things that are still lacking in the old structure today. On 5 May 1988 five buildings of the museum were designated as registered tangible cultural property. The storage space was further extended in  2003. The admission office and the three museum buildings are connected by sheltered walkways.

Collection
The museum stores more than 50,000 artifacts of which more than 28,000 have been designated as valuable. This includes 186 objects or sets of objects designated as 21 National Treasures (about 4800 articles), 147 Important Cultural Properties (about 20,000 articles), 16 Important Cultural Properties of Wakayama Prefecture (about 2850 articles) and 2 Important Works of Art.

National Treasures

Paintings

Eight National Treasure paintings owned by six of Koyasan's temples are stored at the Reihōkan. A  hanging scroll showing the  has been designated as National Treasure.

, owned by Kongōbu-ji is a large scale,  hanging scroll painted with color on silk. Dated to 1086, Heian period, it is a type of Nirvana painting (nehan-zu) depicting the death and entrance to nirvana of the historical Buddha (Shaka). Typical for this kid of paintings, Shaka is shown lying on his deathbed surrounded by mourners. This painting is the oldest extant and finest of its type.

The scroll painted in colors on silk measures . An inscription on the top tells of a wooden sculpture of Gonsō being created after his death by his pupils praying for happiness in the next world and praising Gonsō's learning and virtue.

The triptych  depicts Amida Nyorai, surrounded by Buddhist saints playing musical instruments, come to greet the spirits of the deceased to escort them to the Pure Land, a topic known as raigō-zu (来迎図).

Originally consisting of five scrolls, the mid-Heian period treasure known as  now consists of only three hanging scrolls after two were destroyed by fire in 1888.

Literally the term Senchū Yūgen means inspired vision while on a boat. It is said that this Kannon appeared to the monk and founder of Shingon Buddhism, Kūkai in 806 while on a boat to China. Having the appearance of a deva and crowned with flowers, Senchū Yūgen Kannon is shown calming the waves with the hands.

Painted with color on silk, the scroll measures .

Ike no Taiga, among the most famous Edo period painters, decorated fusuma sliding partitions with landscape scenes in the nanga style. The designated National Treasure known as  consists of ten paintings with color on paper.

Sculptures

There are two National Treasures in the sculpture category, both owned by Kongōbu-ji. An 8th century Tang dynasty  brought back from China by Kūkai is stored at the museum. This  sandalwood,  carving contains various Buddhist images.

The remaining two were produced in the 14th century and are not included in this nomination.

Crafts

A  and plover motifs from the 12th century Heian period is the only crafts National Treasure at the museum. The chest is covered with black lacquer and gold dust has been sprinkled to form the image of plovers playing in the marsh. It is thought that the chest was once used to store Buddhist scriptures.

Writings
Koyasan Reihōkan holds ten National Treasures related to writing, including six that are copies of sutras or sets of sutras, one religious study, two Japanese manuscripts of parts of the Wenguan cilin and one large set of ancient documents related to Mount Kōya.

Buddhist writings
Sutras

is a large-scale collection of sutras, Buddhist regulations and sutra explanations initiated by Fujiwara no Kiyohira; dedicated to Chūson-ji and later presented to Kongōbu-ji by Toyotomi Hidetsugu. The articles are decorated with various pictures in gold and silver paint. A set of 15 similar scrolls that were part of the same collection remained at Chūson-ji and are part of another National Treasure. The items date to the Heian period from the second month 1117 to the third month 1126. In total there are 4,296 items: handscrolls with gold and silver letters on indigo blue paper.

The other, consisting of two scroll is unusual in having 34 characters per line instead of the usual 17.

Treatises, commentaries

Chinese books

Other manuscripts of this work had been lost in China as early as the 9th century. The treasure from Shōchi-in amounts to twelve scrolls from the Tang dynasty and Heian period, 677–823; the one from Hōju-in consists of a single scroll.

Ancient documents

A large set of documents on the history, territory, function, and other aspects of life at Mount Kōya from the Heian period – Azuchi-Momoyama period has been designated as National Treasure in the category ancient documents. Included in this collection are  letters of notable historical figures such as Minamoto no Yoritomo, Minamoto no Yoshitsune and Saigyō Hōshi.

See also 
 List of National Treasures of Japan (sculptures)
 List of National Treasures of Japan (paintings)
 List of National Treasures of Japan (writings: others)
 List of National Treasures of Japan (writings: Chinese books)
 List of National Treasures of Japan (crafts: others)
 List of National Treasures of Japan (ancient documents)

References

Bibliography

.

External links 
 
 
 

Art museums and galleries in Japan
Museums in Wakayama Prefecture
Kōya, Wakayama